William Dana or Bill Dana may refer to:

 Bill Dana (1924–2017), stage name of William Szathmary, American comedian, actor, and screenwriter
 William H. Dana (1930–2014), NASA test pilot and astronaut
 William Parsons Winchester Dana (1833–1927), American artist
 Mrs. William Starr Dana, name used by Frances Theodora Parsons (1861–1952), American botanist and author

See also
 William Dana Ewart, American inventor
 William Dana Orcutt, American book designer